Thomas T. Burke (1876 – 20 November 1951) was an Irish Independent politician. 

He was born in Dunsallagh, Milltown Malbay, County Clare, son of Thomas Burke, a farmer, and his wife Mary (née Burke). From age 16 he developed a wide reputation throughout County Clare and beyond for his putative skills as a bonesetter, travelling long distances to attend patients, and treating a constant stream of sufferers at his farmhouse in Dunsallagh East, where he lived and worked all his life. Though he was deeply revered by many, opinion regarding the efficacy of his treatments varied sharply. In a nationally renowned case in 1912, he was acquitted by jury of a charge of manslaughter, arising from the death by gangrene of a man whose injured leg he had set and bound; an autopsy determined that the limb had not been broken. 

From 1906 to 1920 he was sometime member of both Ennistymon Rural District Council and Milltown Malbay Council. He served on Clare County Council from 1925 to 195). His political affiliations were changeable: through the 1920s he belonged variously to the Labour Party, Sinn Féin, and Fianna Fáil. Failing to secure a Fianna Fáil nomination to contest the 1932 general election, he left the party and continued as an independent. Proposed as general election candidate at the 1937 nominating convention of the newly organised Clare Farmers' Party, he was summoned to the convention hall in Ennis. After announcing his support for the party manifesto, he accepted the nomination, pausing to set a delegate's dislocated ankle before hastening back to attend patients elsewhere in the town. Receiving 6,333 first-preference votes, second among ten candidates behind only Éamon de Valera. 

He was elected to Dáil Éireann as an independent Teachta Dála (TD) at the 1937 general election for the Clare constituency. He was re-elected on four occasions and served until he was defeated at the 1951 general election. In 1951, his tally reduced to 4,031 first preferences, he was defeated by 107 votes for the last seat by Fianna Fáil's Patrick Hillery.

Projecting himself and his party (which organised fifty branches throughout the county) as 'non-political' – he described the farmer's three enemies as the weather, the markets, and politicians – he retained the seat in the 1938 general election with a slight increase in first preferences. When the Clare Farmers' Party was subsumed into the new national farmers' party, Clann na Talmhan, Burke, pleading the support of a wife and large family, and his willingness to assume his own election deposit and expenses, declined to comply with the Clann's £10-per-week levy on Dáil salaries, and was dropped as their candidate in February 1943. He retained his seat as an independent in the subsequent 1943 general election, in which none of the constituency's three Clann na Talmhan candidates was returned. 

His attendance in the Dáil and at political meetings generally was notoriously poor; through fourteen years as a TD he spoke in the chamber five times, never after 1939. He regarded his TDs salary as deserved recompense for long years of therapeutic labours, for which 'his fee was a handshake'. Consistent with the traditions of the bonesetter's craft, he never demanded direct payment.

Burke had at least five sons and six daughters by two marriages; his second wife, Margaret, survived him. He died 20 November 1951.

References

1876 births
1951 deaths
Independent TDs
Members of the 9th Dáil
Members of the 10th Dáil
Members of the 11th Dáil
Members of the 12th Dáil
Members of the 13th Dáil